Zărnești is a commune in Buzău County, Muntenia, Romania. It is composed of five villages: Comisoaia, Fundeni (the commune centre), Pruneni, Vadu Sorești and Zărnești.

Notes

Communes in Buzău County
Localities in Muntenia